Heather Charisse McGhee is a New York Times bestselling author and policy advocate. She is a former president and currently a trustee emeritus of Demos, a non-profit progressive U.S. think tank. McGhee is a regular contributor to NBC News and frequently appears as a guest and panelist on Meet the Press, All In with Chris Hayes, and Real Time with Bill Maher.

Early life and education 
Heather Charisse McGhee grew up in the South Side, Chicago and is the daughter of Gail C. Christopher and Earl J. McGhee. In seventh grade, McGhee enrolled in The Bement School as a boarding student. graduated from Milton Academy in 1997. McGhee received a B.A. in American Studies from Yale University in 2001. She was initially drawn to theater and creative writing but eventually became interested in economic policy.

McGhee attended the UC Berkeley School of Law, citing how law school could help give her the credentials to change public policy. She graduated with a J.D. in 2009.

Career

Positions 
After graduating from Yale in 2001, she taught English in Barcelona for a short time, but soon after the September 11 attacks she moved to Hollywood to pursue a career in television writing. 

After about a year, she moved to New York City and began working with the non-profit think tank, Demos. In 2003, McGhee first connected with Elizabeth Warren and her daughter, Amelia Warren Tyagi, on the topic of credit card debt. 

She left Demos to pursue a law degree and serve as a Deputy Policy Director for the John Edwards 2008 presidential campaign.

McGhee returned to Demos in 2009 and co-chaired a task force with Americans for Financial Reform which helped develop the Dodd-Frank Wall Street Reform and Consumer Protection Act in 2009. McGhee became the president of Demos in 2014. In early 2018, she stepped down as president but remained a distinguished senior fellow at Demos.

In December 2019 McGhee became chair of the board of directors of Color of Change.

Appearances and Talks 
In 2016, McGhee's televised phone conversation with a man named Gary on C-SPAN who admitted racial prejudice ("I'm a White male, and I am prejudiced. The reason it is something I wasn't taught but it's kind of something that I learned.") was widely covered by news media organizations and viewed over a million times. A year later, Gary stated he had taken her advice to heart and his views had changed.

In 2019, McGhee presented at a TED (conference) a talk entitled "Racism has a cost for everyone."

In 2021, McGhee was interviewed by Christiane Amanpour on CNN, titled "Why racism hurts everyone, regardless of race."

McGhee has appeared on episodes of Pod Save America and was a guest host for a live recording of the podcast in Boston.

In September 2022, McGhee gave a brief interview with NPR's Ari Shapiro to discuss the student debt crisis.

The Sum of Us: What Racism Costs Everyone and How We Can Prosper Together 
In March 2021, her book "The Sum of Us: What Racism Costs Everyone and How We Can Prosper Together" debuted at #3 on the New York Times best seller list (for non-fiction). In it she discusses what she calls "drained-pool politics".

The Sum of Us Podcast 
In July 2022, McGhee debuted "The Sum of Us Podcast", which expands on her book by the same title.

References

External links

1980 births
Living people
African-American women in politics
African-American women journalists
African-American journalists
African-American women lawyers
African-American lawyers
African-American women writers
American women lawyers
Milton Academy alumni
University of California, Berkeley alumni
Yale University alumni
21st-century African-American people
21st-century African-American women
20th-century African-American people
20th-century African-American women